Gioiosa Ionica is a town and comune in Italy in the province of Reggio Calabria, region of Calabria.

The remains of a theatre belonging to the Roman period were discovered in 1883. The ruins of an ancient building called the Naviglio, the nature of which does not seem clear, are described (ib. 1884, p. 252).

References

Cities and towns in Calabria